BWCA may refer to:

Boundary Waters Canoe Area Wilderness, a wilderness area in Minnesota
Bwca (booka), a household spirit in Welsh mythology